Avner Cohen (born 1951) is an Israeli writer, historian, and professor. He is well known for his works on Israel's nuclear history and strategic policy. He is currently a professor at the Middlebury Institute of International Studies, and the Director of the Education Program and Senior Fellow at the James Martin Center for Nonproliferation Studies.

Cohen grew up in Ramat HaSharon. He received a B.A. in Philosophy from Tel Aviv University in 1975. He then studied at York University where he received an M.A. in Philosophy in 1977 and four years later earned a Ph.D. from the University of Chicago in the Committee on History of Culture.  After these studies he embarked on an academic career, starting by teaching at Washington University in St. Louis and Ben-Gurion University before returning to Tel Aviv University in 1983 to join the department of philosophy.  He held positions at Massachusetts Institute of Technology, Harvard and is affiliated with the Middlebury Institute of International Studies and James Martin Center for Nonproliferation Studies.

Cohen has researched various issues with regard to nuclear weapons, including deterrence, morality, and proliferation.  His seminal work, Israel and the Bomb, which chronicled the Israeli nuclear program, was published in 1998. This book led him to encounter problems with the Israeli censor, and provoked substantial legal difficulties upon his return to Israel to give a keynote speech at an academic conference.

His book, The Worst-Kept Secret: Israel's Bargain with the Bomb, was published in 2010 and explored Israel's policy of opacity when it comes to its nuclear history.

Cohen has been critical of what he considers Benjamin Netanyahu's deployment of the Holocaust for political ends.

Works
 (Ph.D. thesis)
 (with Steven Lee)
 (with Marcelo Dascal) (reprint )
 (with Marvin Miller)

References

External links
The Avner Cohen Collection hosted at the Nuclear Proliferation International History Project
 Interview with Ha'aretz

Selected Op-Eds

“Israeli Talk of Attacking Iran Damages Relationship with US,” September 4, 2012, Israeli Talk of Attacking Iran Damages Relationship with US

“Israel’s Leadership: Messianic and then some,” Ha’artez, May 6, 2012, Israel's Leadership: Messianic and Then Some.

“Netanyahu’s Contempt for the Holocaust,” Ha’artez, March 19, 2012, Netanyahu's Contempt for the Holocaust.

“Israel Fears Losing Nuclear Monopoly, Talks of War with Iran,” Al Monitor, February 14, 2012, .

Selected Citations

“What About Israel’s Nukes?,” The New Yorker, March 5, 2012, by John Cassidy, What About Israel’s Nukes?.

“Preventing a Nuclear Iran, Peacefully,” New York Times, January 15, 2012, Opinion | Preventing a Nuclear Iran, Peacefully.

“The Real Lesson of Iraq,” The New York Times, November 28, 2011, by Malfrid Braut-Hegghammer, Opinion | The Real Lesson of Iraq.

Living people
Tel Aviv University alumni
University of Chicago alumni
Massachusetts Institute of Technology faculty
Harvard University faculty
University of Maryland, College Park faculty
1951 births
York University alumni
Washington University in St. Louis faculty
Academic staff of Ben-Gurion University of the Negev
Academic staff of Tel Aviv University